Brad Crawford (born December 13, 1955) is a former American football player.  He was elected to the College Football Hall of Fame in 2000.

References

1955 births
College Football Hall of Fame inductees
Living people
Franklin Grizzlies football players